Rizuiyeh (also Romanized as Rīzū’īyeh and Rizoo’eyeh; also known as Nīrū’īyeh, Razaviyeh, Rezu, Rīzū, and Tūkh Rāja) is a village in Shaab Jereh Rural District, Toghrol Al Jerd District, Kuhbanan County, Kerman Province, Iran. At the 2006 census, its population was 45, in 13 families.

References 

Populated places in Kuhbanan County